The Kobstaedernes ATP Challenger is a tennis tournament held in Kolding, Denmark since 2005. The event is part of the ''ATP challenger series and is played on indoor hard courts.

Past finals

Singles

Doubles

References

External links 
 
ITF Search

ATP Challenger Tour
Tennis tournaments in Denmark
Hard court tennis tournaments